Catarina Martins de Mesquita Paiva Costa (born 21 September 1996) is a Portuguese judoka.

She is the gold medallist of the 2019 Judo Grand Slam Brasilia and represented Portugal at the 2020 Summer Olympics in Tokyo.

At the 2021 Judo Grand Slam Abu Dhabi held in Abu Dhabi, United Arab Emirates, she won one of the bronze medals in her event.

References

External links
 
 
 

1996 births
Living people
Sportspeople from Coimbra
Portuguese female judoka
Judoka at the 2019 European Games
Judoka at the 2020 Summer Olympics
Olympic judoka of Portugal
21st-century Portuguese women